Anna Maria Ahlstrand (born 24 August 1980) is a Swedish football midfielder, who played for Göteborg FC in Sweden's Damallsvenskan.

Career 
285 matches for Göteborg

References

External links 
 
 

1980 births
Living people
Swedish women's footballers
BK Häcken FF players
Damallsvenskan players
Women's association football defenders